Otis is the debut solo album of Mojo Nixon. Released in 1990, it featured guest appearances by John Doe of X, Country Dick Montana (Beat Farmers), Bill Davis (Dash Rip Rock) and Eric Roscoe Ambel (The Del-Lords).

Nixon's first album since splitting with Skid Roper, and released by Enigma Records, the album was seen as potentially Nixon's break-out album but the record label's demise due to financial issues dashed any chance of success.

The album includes humorous commentary on targets such as soft rock ("Don Henley Must Die"), the legal profession ("Destroy All Lawyers"), politics, and Shane MacGowan's teeth. Featuring a band of established musicians from other bands and produced by Jim Dickinson, the album's music was considered to be stronger than Nixon's previous releases.

Track listing 
 "Destroy All Lawyers" (3:00)
 "I Wanna Race Bigfoot Trucks" (3:45)
 "Ain't High Falutin'" (3:16)
 "Shane's Dentist" (2:04)
 "Rabies Baby" (3:30)
 "Put a Sex Mo-Sheen in the White House" (4:18)
 "Star Spangled Mojo" (Traditional; arranged by Mojo Nixon) (1:23)
 "You Can Dress 'Em Up (But You Can't Take 'Em Out)" (2:51)
 "Don Henley Must Die" (4:20)
 "Perry Mason of Love" (5:46)
 "Took Out the Trash and Never Came Back" (4:42)
 "Gonna Be a New World" (3:53)

Personnel 
 Mojo Nixon – vocals, guitar, sheep
John Doe – bass guitar, backing vocals, monkey socks
 Country Dick Montana – drums, deep vocals, zipperneck
 Bill Davis – guitar, backing vocals, hatchet-ass
 Eric Roscoe Ambel – guitar, backing vocals, lightbulb
 Jim Spake – saxophone
 Reed McCoy – trumpet
 East Memphis Slim – keyboards
 William C. Brown III – backing vocals
 Zooty – bells
 Dale Lavi - aluminum cans
 Luther Dickinson – teenage guitar
 Robby Turner – steel guitar
Technical
 Bob Krusen – engineering, mix
 Jim Dickinson – mixing
 Karen Kuehn – photography
 Gopher Killer – Polaroid
 Rudy Tuesday – design

References

External links
 Mojo Nixon's home page
 Dash Rip Rock's home page
 Otis promotional video

1990 albums
Mojo Nixon albums
Albums produced by Jim Dickinson
Enigma Records albums